Paul Dessau (19 December 189428 June 1979) was a German composer and conductor. He collaborated with Bertolt Brecht and composed incidental music for his plays, and several operas based on them.

Biography 
Dessau was born in Hamburg into a musical family. His grandfather, Moses Berend Dessau, was a cantor in the Hamburg synagogue.

From 1909, Dessau majored in violin, studying with Florian Zajic at the Klindworth-Scharwenka Conservatory in Berlin. In 1912 he became répétiteur at the Stadttheater Hamburg, the municipal theatre. He was second Kapellmeister at the Tivoli Theatre in Bremen in 1914 before being drafted for military service in 1915 .

After World War I he became conductor at the Kammerspiele Hamburg, and was répétiteur and later Kapellmeister at the Cologne Opera under Otto Klemperer between 1919 and 1923. In 1923 he became Kapellmeister at the Staatstheater Mainz and from 1925 Principal Kapellmeister at the Städtische Oper Berlin under Bruno Walter.

In 1933 Dessau emigrated to France, and 1939 moved further to the United States, where initially he lived in New York before moving to Hollywood in 1943 . Dessau returned to Germany with his second wife, the writer Elisabeth Hauptmann, and settled in East Berlin in 1948.

Starting in 1952, he taught at the Staatliche Schauspielschule (State drama school) in Berlin-Oberschöneweide where he was appointed professor in 1959. He became a member of the GDR Akademie der Künste in 1952 and was vice-president of this institution between 1957 and 1962. He taught many master classes, his students including Friedrich Goldmann, Reiner Bredemeyer, Jörg Herchet, Friedrich Schenker, Luca Lombardi and Karl Ottomar Treibmann.

Dessau was married four times: Gudrun Kabisch (1924), with whom he had two children, Elisabeth Hauptmann (1948),  (1952), and choreographer and director Ruth Berghaus (1954), with whom he had a son, Maxim Dessau (b. 1954) who became a film director.

Dessau died on 28 June 1979 at the age of 84, in Königs Wusterhausen, on the outskirts of Berlin.

Works 
Dessau composed operas, scenic plays, incidental music, ballets, symphonies and other works for orchestra, and pieces for solo instruments as well as vocal music. From the 1920s on, he was fascinated by film music. He composed music for early movies of Walt Disney, as well as background music for silent pictures and early German films. While in exile in Paris he wrote the oratorio Hagadah shel Pessach after a libretto by Max Brod. In the 1950s in collaboration with Bertolt Brecht he focused on the musical theatre. During that time several of his operas were produced. He also wrote Gebrauchsmusik (utility music) for the propaganda of the German Democratic Republic. At the same time he lobbied for the musical avant-garde (e.g. Witold Lutosławski, Alfred Schnittke, Boris Blacher, Hans Werner Henze and Luigi Nono). His compositions were published by Schott. The Akademie holds many of his works in its archives.

Operas 
All operas by Dessau were premiered at the Staatsoper Berlin.
 Die Reisen des Glücksgotts (fragment), 1945 (after Bertolt Brecht)
 Die Verurteilung des Lukullus, after Brecht's Das Verhör des Lukullus, 1949–1951, world premiere on 17 March 1951
 Puntila, 1956–1959, libretto by Peter Palitzsch and Manfred Wekwerth after Brecht's play, 15 November 1966
 Die heilige Johanna der Schlachthöfe [fragment], 1961, after Brecht's play
 Lanzelot, 1967–69, libretto by Heiner Müller and Ginka Tsholakova, 19 December 1969
 Einstein (opera), 1969–1973, libretto by Karl Mickel, 16 February 1974
 Leonce und Lena (opera), 1976–1979, libretto by  after Georg Büchner's play, 24 November 1979

Incidental music 
 99%- eine deutsche Heerschau"  (Furcht und Elend des Dritten Reiches) 1938
 Guernica 1938
 Mutter Courage und ihre Kinder: Chronik aus dem Dreißigjährigen Krieg 1946–1949
 Der gute Mensch von Sezuan 1947–1948
 Die Ausnahme und die Regel 1948
 Herr Puntila und sein Knecht Matti, folk play, 1949
 Wie dem deutschen Michel geholfen wird. Clownspiel (clown play)  1949
 Der Hofmeister 1950
 Herrnburger Bericht for youth choir, soloists and orchestra 1951
 Mann ist Mann 1951–1956
 Urfaust 1952–1953
 Don Juan 1953
 Der kaukasische Kreidekreis 1953–1954
 Coriolan 1964

Film music 
 Alice the Fire Fighter (Alice und ihre Feuerwehr) (21.8.1928), Alice's Monkey Business (Alice und die Flöhe) (25.9.1928), Alice in the Wooly West (Alice und die Wildwest-Banditen) (18.10.1928) and Alice Helps the Romance (Alice und der Selbstmörder) (31.1.1929) by Walt Disney
 L'Horloge Magique. 2. La Forêt enchanté (Der verzauberte Wald) (7 September 1928) and L'Horloge Magique. 1. L'Horloge Magique (Die Wunderuhr) (12 November 1928) by Ladislas Starewitch
 Doktor Doolittle und seine Tiere (15 December 1928) by Lotte Reiniger with arrangements of music by Kurt Weill, Paul Hindemith and a private composition
 Musical director in musical and operetta films together with Richard Tauber (among others The Land of Smiles, Melody of Love). with melodies by Franz Lehár and Bronislaw Kaper
 400 cm^3 documentary
 Storm over Mont Blanc, The White Ecstasy and S.O.S. Eisberg by Arnold Fanck
 White Cargo (by Robert Siodmak), Yoshiwara (by Max Ophüls), The Novel of Werther (by Ophüls)
 Crossroads (1938)
 Gibraltar (1938)
 The White Slave (1939)

Works for choir 
 Deutsches Miserere for mixed choir, children's choir, soprano, alto, tenor and bass soloists, large orchestra, organ and trautonium 1943–1944
 Internationale Kriegsfibel for soloists, mixed choir and instruments 1944–45
 Die Erziehung der Hirse, musical epic for one narrator, one solo voice, mixed choir, youth choir and large orchestra 1952–1954
 Vier Grabschriften.
 Grabschrift für Gorki for one or several male voices and brass (1947)
 Grabschrift für Rosa Luxemburg for mixed choir and orchestra
 Grabschrift für Liebknecht
 Grabschrift für Lenin
 5 Songs for three female voices a cappella:
 "Die Thälmannkolonne"
 "Mein Bruder war ein Flieger"
 "Vom Kind, das sich nicht waschen wollte"
 "Sieben Rosen hat der Strauch"
 "Lied von der Bleibe"
" Appell der Arbeiterklasse" for alto and tenor solo, narrator, children's and mixed choir and large orchestra, 1960–1961

Songs 
 "Kampflied der schwarzen Strohhüte" 1936
 "Freiheit" (also known as "Thälmann-Kolonne") 1936
 "Lied einer deutschen Mutter" 1943
 "Das deutsche Miserere" 1943
 "Horst-Dussel-Lied" 1943
 "Wiegenlied für Gesang und Gitarre" 1947
 "Aufbaulied der FDJ" 1948
 "Zukunftslied" 1949
 "Friedenslied" for one solo voice with one accompanying voice (text: Bertolt Brecht after Pablo Neruda) 1951
 "Der Augsburger Kreidekreis" A dramatic ballad for music 1952
 "Jakobs Söhne ziehen aus, im Ägyptenland Lebensmittel zu holen" for children's choir, soloists and instruments 1953
 "Der anachronistische Zug" ballad for song, piano and percussion 1956
 "Kleines Lied" for song and piano 1965
 "Historie vom verliebten Schwein Malchus" for solo voice 1973
 "Spruch für Gesang und Klavier" 1973
 "Bei den Hochgestellten" 1975

Other compositions 
 In memoriam Bertolt Brecht for large orchestra 1956–1957
 Bach-Variationen for large orchestra 1963
 Symphonic Mozart-Adaptation (after the Quintet, K.614) 1965
 Lenin, music for orchestra no. 3 with concluding chorus "Grabschrift für Lenin" 1969
 Für Helli, small piece for piano 1971
 Bagatelles for viola and piano (1975)
 Sonatine for viola and piano (1929)
 2 symphonies
 7 string quartets and others

Awards 
 Award of the music publisher Schott 1924
 National Prize III. Category 1953
 National Prize II. Category 1956
 National Prize I. Category 1965
 Vaterländischer Verdienstorden (Decoration of Honour for Services to the GDR) in Gold 1965
 Karl-Marx-Orden (Karl-Marx–Decoration) 1969
 National Prize I. Category 1974

 Sources 
 Dessau, Paul. Notizen zu Noten, ed. Fritz Henneberg (Reclam, Leipzig 1974).
 Dessau, Paul. Aus Gesprächen (VEB Deutscher Verlag für Musik, Leipzig 1974).
 Henneberg, Fritz. Dessau – Brecht. Musikalische Arbeiten. (Henschel, Berlin 1963).
 Hennenberg, Fritz. Paul Dessau. Eine Biographie. (VEB Deutscher Verlag für Musik, Leipzig 1965).
 Lucchesi, Joachim (ed.). Das Verhör in der Oper: Die Debatte um die Aufführung "Das Verhör des Lukullus" von Bertolt Brecht und Paul Dessau'' (BasisDruck, Berlin 1993).

References

Cited sources

External links 

 
 
 
 Paul Dessau (Composer) Bach Cantatas Website
 Paul Dessau – Komponist / Biografie (in German) cinegraph.de

1894 births
1979 deaths
German male classical composers
German opera composers
Male opera composers
German film score composers
Male film score composers
20th-century classical composers
Jewish classical composers
Jewish emigrants from Nazi Germany to the United States
Musicians from Hamburg
German military personnel of World War I
Recipients of the Patriotic Order of Merit
Recipients of the National Prize of East Germany
20th-century German composers
Klindworth-Scharwenka Conservatory alumni
20th-century German male musicians
East German musicians